Thomas Stockdale  of Bilton Park (died 25 December 1653) supported the Parliamentary cause during the English Civil War, and sat as a member for Knaresborough in the Long Parliament from 1645.

Stockdale married Margaret, second daughter of Sir William Parsons, an Elizabethan commissioner of plantations in Ireland. they had issue that included Elizabeth (d. 25 October 1694).

Notes

References
Burke, Bernard (1866). A genealogical history of the dormant, abeyant, forfeited, and extinct peerages of the British empire, Harrison.
Gent, Thomas (1733). The antient and modern history of the loyal town of Rippon: ... Besides are added, travels into other parts of Yorkshire ... Faithfully and painfully collected by Tho. Gent, ..., A. Bettesworth and C. Hitch, London.
James, John (1866). Continuation and additions to the History of Bradford, and its parish,Longmans.

Roundheads
1653 deaths
Year of birth unknown
English MPs 1640–1648
English MPs 1648–1653